Raven Klaasen (born 16 October 1982) is a South African professional tennis player who specialises in doubles.

He achieved his career-high doubles ranking of world No. 7 in August 2019, and has won 19 doubles titles on the ATP Tour, including two at Masters 1000 level. Klaasen is a two-time Grand Slam finalist, having finished runner-up at the 2014 Australian Open alongside Eric Butorac, and the 2018 Wimbledon Championships with Michael Venus. He was also runner up at the ATP Finals in both 2016 and 2019, partnering Rajeev Ram and Venus respectively.

In singles, Klaasen has a career-high ranking of world No. 208, achieved in October 2011.

He has represented South Africa in the Davis Cup since 2009, and has a win–loss record of 13–4.

He reached his 300th match win at the 2022 Estoril Open with Ben McLachlan defeating Hugo Nys/Jan Zieliński in the round of 16.

Significant finals

Grand Slam finals

Doubles: 2 (2 runners-up)

Year-end championships

Doubles: 2 (2 runners-up)

Masters 1000 finals

Doubles: 5 (2 titles, 3 runners-up)

ATP career finals

Doubles: 42 (19 titles, 23 runner-ups)

Doubles performance timeline

Current through the 2022 Davis Cup.

References

External links
 
 
 

1982 births
Living people
Coloured South African people
South African people of Dutch descent
South African male tennis players
Sportspeople from Qonce
African Games medalists in tennis
African Games gold medalists for South Africa
African Games silver medalists for South Africa
Competitors at the 2003 All-Africa Games